C.N. Gorman Museum is a museum focused on Native American and Indigenous artists, founded in 1973 at University of California, Davis (UC Davis) in Davis, California.

History 
The C.N. Gorman Museum was founded in 1973 by the Department of Native American Studies at UC Davis. The name of the museum is in honor of Carl Nelson Gorman, the Navajo code talker, artist, and a former faculty member at UC Davis.

Collection 
As of 2015, the museum holds a collect of 860 objects by 250 artists. Artists in the museum collection include Frank LaPena, Jaune Quick-to-See Smith, Melanie Yazzie, Rick Bartow, Benjamin Haldane, James Schoppert, Dana Claxton, Frank Tuttle, Garnet Pavatea, and many others.

Leadership 

Hulleah J. Tsinhnahjinnie presently serves as director of the museum, which started in 2004. 

George Longfish served as the museum founding director and curator, from 1974 to 1996. Following Longfish, Theresa Harlan succeeded as director and curator, from 1996 to 2000.

Building 
The museum lived at Hart Hall, from 1992 until 2020. In 2020–2021, the museum was in the process of expanding and relocating to the former Richard L. Nelson Gallery (which closed in 2015) in Nelson Hall on campus.

See also 
 Manetti Shrem Museum of Art

References 

Art museums and galleries in California
University of California, Davis campus
Art museums established in 1973
1973 establishments in California
Native American museums in California